Khadia is a genus of plants in the family Aizoaceae. Some species under this genus include:

 Khadia acutipetala 
 Khadia alticola
 Khadia beswickii (L.Bolus) N.E.Br.
 Khadia borealis
 Khadia carolinensis
 Khadia media
 Khadia nationae
 Khadia nelsonii

Aizoaceae
Aizoaceae genera
Taxonomy articles created by Polbot
Taxa named by N. E. Brown